The voiced alveolar trill is a type of consonantal sound used in some spoken languages. It is commonly called the rolled R, rolling R, or trilled R. Quite often,  is used in phonemic transcriptions (especially those found in dictionaries) of languages like English and German that have rhotic consonants that are not an alveolar trill. That is partly for ease of typesetting and partly because  is the letter used in the orthographies of such languages.

In many Indo-European languages, a trill may often be reduced to a single vibration in unstressed positions. In Italian, a simple trill typically displays only one or two vibrations, while a geminate trill will have three or more. Languages where trills always have multiple vibrations include Albanian,  Spanish, Cypriot Greek, and a number of Armenian and Portuguese dialects.

People with ankyloglossia may find it exceptionally difficult to articulate the sound because of the limited mobility of their tongues.

Voiced alveolar trill

Features
Features of the voiced alveolar trill:

 Its place of articulation may be 
 dental (behind the upper front teeth),
 alveolar (at the alveolar ridge), or 
 post-alveolar (behind the alveolar ridge). 
 It is most often apical, which means it is pronounced with the tip of the tongue.

Occurrence

Dental

Alveolar

Post-alveolar

Variable

Voiced alveolar fricative trill 

In Czech, there are two contrasting alveolar trills. Besides the typical apical trill, written r, there is another laminal trill, written ř, in words such as rybáři  'fishermen' and the common surname Dvořák. Its manner of articulation is similar to  but is laminal and the body of the tongue is raised. It is thus partially fricative, with the frication sounding rather like  but less retracted. In the IPA, it is typically written as  plus the raising diacritic, but it has also been written as laminal . (Before the 1989 IPA Kiel Convention, it had a dedicated symbol .) The Kobon language of Papua New Guinea also has a fricative trill, but the degree of frication is variable.

Features
Features of the voiced alveolar fricative trill:
Its manner of articulation is fricative trill, which means it is a non-sibilant fricative and a trill pronounced simultaneously.
 Its place of articulation is laminal alveolar, which means it is articulated with the blade of the tongue at the alveolar ridge.

Examples

See also
 Index of phonetics articles

Notes

References

External links
 

Alveolar consonants
Trill consonants
Pulmonic consonants
Oral consonants
Central consonants